Murrysville is a home rule municipality in Westmoreland County, Pennsylvania, United States. The population was 21,006 at the 2020 census. It is part of the Pittsburgh metropolitan area.

History

The Haymaker Gas Well in Murrysville was the nation's first commercial natural gas well. For some time, it remained the largest commercial gas well in the world. Murrysville was described in the first half of the 20th century as being "the center of a district dotted with gas wells, the first of which was bored in 1878; wild speculation in leases precipitated the open conflict known as the 'Haymaker Riots,' named for the speculator killed in one of them." 

Since 1933, Murrysville has had a "tree sign" spelling out the word "Murrysville". The trees were landscaped to grow and form the letters by local Boy Scouts. The sign is situated on a large hill as one enters the Municipality from the Murrysville–Monroeville border, near U.S. Route 22. In 1947, the sign was featured in "Ripley's Believe It Or Not" as the world's largest arboreal sign. (It is no longer the world's largest, or even the largest in the country; "Luecke", near San Antonio, Texas, is much larger.)  The "Y" in the Murrysville sign points to the Haymaker Gas Well.

In 1977, Murrysville was designated the "Gateway to Westmoreland County" by Mayor Walt Dollman in conjunction with the Chamber of Commerce.  In 2012, community leaders upgraded sign and landscaping elaborately at the main entrance at the Allegheny / Westmoreland border featuring this designation.  As is shown at the introduction of this page, the Gateway designation is featured on the official Seal of the Municipality.

Murrysville became a home rule municipality in August 1976, when its electorate voted for a Charter designating it a Municipality.

Geography
Murrysville is located at  (40.434828, -79.656724). It is roughly 20 miles east of Pittsburgh on U.S. Route 22, just east of the county line that separates Westmoreland and Allegheny counties. Murrysville is a control city on the sign for eastbound US 22 at the eastern end of I-376 in Monroeville.

Among the neighborhoods within Murrysville are Murrysville Heights, Heather Highlands, Franklin Estates, Settlers Ridge (The Ridge), Dunningtown, Newlonsburg, Ringertown, Sardis, and White Valley. Murrysville surrounds, but does not include, the Borough of Export, which is a separate municipal entity.

Surrounding municipalities
Murrysville has eight borders, including Upper Burrell Township to the north, Washington Township to the north and east, Salem Township to the south and southeast, Delmont to the southeast, Penn Township to the south, and the Allegheny County municipalities of Monroeville to the southwest and Plum to the west.  The borough of Export is situated inside Murrysville in the south-southeast section.

Demographics
As of the census of 2000, there were 18,872 people, 7,083 households, and 5,630 families located in the municipality. The population density was 511.0 people per square mile (197.3/km2). There were 7,396 housing units at an average density of 200.3 per square mile (77.3/km2). The racial makeup of the Municipality  was 95.38% White, 0.61% African American, 0.05% Native American, 3.28% Asian, 0.01% Pacific Islander, 0.16% from other races, and 0.50% from two or more races. Hispanic or Latino of any race were 0.56% of the population.

There were 7,083 households, out of which 34.5% had children under the age of 18 living with them, 71.8% were married couples living together, 5.5% had a female householder with no husband present, and 20.5% were non-families. 18.4% of all households were made up of individuals, and 9.0% had someone living alone who was 65 years of age or older. The average household size was 2.63 and the average family size was 3.01.

In the Municipality population was spread out, with 24.9% under the age of 18, 4.9% from 18 to 24, 24.3% from 25 to 44, 30.3% from 45 to 64, and 15.6% who were 65 years of age or older. The median age was 43 years. For every 100 females, there were 97.9 males. For every 100 females age 18 and over, there were 93.1 males.

The median income for a household in the Municipality was $64,071, and the median income for a family was $72,740. Males had a median income of $58,553 versus $32,567 for females. The per capita income for the Municipality  was $32,017. About 2.2% of families and 2.8% of the population were below the poverty line, including 3.1% of those under age 18 and 3.9% of those age 65 or over.

Government
Murrysville is governed by a mayor (currently Regis J. Synan) who is elected every two years and has executive/administrative powers, and a seven-member council, whose members are elected every four years and have precise legislative powers.

In the mid-1970s, as suburban growth began to occur, the community rapidly transitioned through three forms of government (township, borough, and home rule) and four legal name changes (Franklin Township, Franklin Borough, Murrysville Borough, and Municipality of Murrysville). Since 1976, it has operated under its Home Rule Charter as the Municipality of Murrysville.

Education
Murrysville is part of the Franklin Regional School District. The district operates five schools: three elementary (Sloan, Heritage, Newlonsburg), Franklin Regional Middle School, and Franklin Regional High School, with Dr. Gennaro Piraino as the district's superintendent. The district's high school boasts a graduation rate of 99.3% compared to the national average for public high schools of 82%  and is ranked #213 in Newsweek's 2016 "America's Top High Schools". Private schools include Mother of Sorrows Catholic School. The Free Gospel Bible Institute (FGBI), a Holiness Pentecostal bible college, is located in Murrysville.

Notable people 
 Julie Benz (born 1972), actress
 Jeremiah Burrell (1815–1856), Western Pennsylvania lawyer and judge
 Bobby Engram (born 1973), Seattle Seahawks wide receiver; San Francisco 49ers assistant offensive coordinator
 Eli Evankovich (born 1982), PA House of Representatives, 54th District
 Tom Flynn (born 1962), defensive back for Green Bay Packers and New York Giants 
 Josiah Given (1828–1908) attorney, soldier and Supreme Court justice of Iowa
 Spencer Lee (born 1998), multi-year World Champion in freestyle wrestling, multi-year National Champion in NCAA wrestling at University of Iowa
 Ken Macha (born 1950), Milwaukee Brewers manager and major league third baseman
 Robert Moose (1947–1976), Pittsburgh Pirates, pitcher 1967–1976
 Manu Narayan (born 1973), actor
 Candace Otto (born 1980), Miss Pennsylvania 2003
 Maddie Ziegler (born 2002), dancer and actress 
 Mackenzie Ziegler (born 2004), dancer, singer, model and actress

See also
 Westmoreland Conservancy

References

External links

 Municipality website
 Murrysville's official Community Magazine
 Murrysville Economic and Community Development Corporation
 The Murrysville Star
 Murrysville Business Directory
 News articles about the Murrysville tree sign and efforts to restore it: Pittsburgh Post-Gazette, February 16, 2006
 Penn-Franklin News, based in Murrysville

Home Rule Municipalities in Pennsylvania
Boroughs in Westmoreland County, Pennsylvania
Populated places established in 1788
Pittsburgh metropolitan area
1788 establishments in Pennsylvania